Master and God is a historical novel by British writer Lindsey Davis, the author of the Falco series.  It was first published in the UK on 15 March 2012 by Hodder & Stoughton and in the United States on 5 June 2012 by St Martin's Press.

It is set in ancient Rome in the time of the emperor Domitian and the story features a paranoid emperor, a hairdresser's love-life, the burial alive of the Chief of the Vestal Virgins, conspiracy and death.

Reviews
In a review for The Independent, Jane Jakeman called the narrative "rapid" and described the story as "well told with much sharp-edged detail". A Kirkus Reviews review of the book described it as "Another detailed and witty recounting of ancient Roman life, public and private".

References

External links
 Publisher's website

Novels set in ancient Rome
British historical novels
Novels by Lindsey Davis
2012 British novels
Hodder & Stoughton books
Novels set in the 1st century
Cultural depictions of Domitian